The 17th World Team Challenge 2018 (officially: Joka Classic Biathlon World Team Challenge auf Schalke 2018) was a biathlon competition, that was held at December 29, 2018, at the Veltins-Arena in Gelsenkirchen, Germany. The event was visited by 46.412 fans.

Format of competition 
The competition was held in two stages: mass start and pursuit.

Participants 
20 sportsmen (10 male, 10 female) competed as mixed teams. 10 different countries were represented at this event.
Ole Einar Bjørndalen from Norway and Darya Domracheva from Belarus, who were at the moment retired athletes, took part in this competition as a pair.

Results

Mass start 
Results and video are available here.

Pursuit 
Results, video and photos are available here.

References

External links 
 Results of mass start
 Results of pursuit
 Official Webpage of the Event

World Team Challenge
2018 in biathlon
2018 in German sport